XPO, Inc. is an American transportation company that conducts less-than-truckload shipping in North America. The company's headquarters are located in Greenwich, Connecticut, U.S., and they have 564 locations and globally.

History
The company was initially called Express-1 Expedited Solutions and listed on American Stock Exchange with ticket XPO. It was acquired by Brad Jacobs and renamed to XPO Logistics in September 2011. In June 2012, XPO listed its shares on the New York Stock Exchange.

XPO has acquired a number of logistics businesses in North America and overseas. Some notable acquisitions include: 3PD, Inc. (August 2013), Pacer International, Inc. (March 2014), Norbert Dentressangle SA (April 2015) and Con-way Inc. (October 2015). XPO paid US$3.56 billion, including acquired debt, for European transport company Norbert Dentressangle and US$3 billion for Con-way Inc. 

XPO sold their truckload division (acquired from Con-Way) to TransForce for $558 million in cash.

In June 2016, XPO was included in the Fortune 500 list of the largest U.S. corporations based on revenue.

In 2019, XPO was the first global logistics company to join the Massachusetts Institute of Technology (MIT) Industrial Liaison Program, a partnership organization that pairs MIT resources with corporations worldwide to solve global business challenges.

The company has conducted logistics operations for the Evian Golf Championship and the Paris Marathon. In 2019, XPO Logistics released a mobile game simulating freight operations for the Tour de France.

In March 2022, XPO sold its North American intermodal business to Illinois-based STG Logistics for $710 million.

Company reorganization 
Beginning in 2021, XPO Logistics broke into three separate publicly-traded companies, making XPO solely an LTL provider.

GXO Logistics 
In August 2021, the company spun off its contract logistics business into a separate company named GXO Logistics, with facilities located primarily throughout North America and Europe. GXO stands for “game-changing opportunities”. , Malcolm Wilson is the CEO of the company.

RXO 
This was followed by XPO Logistics spinning off its brokerage and other services segment to a separate company named RXO, Inc. in November 2022. RXO, which stands for “reliability multiplied by outperformance” and provides global forwarding. RXO is headquartered in Charlotte, North Carolina, and provides managed transportation and last-mile logistics. At the time, Drew Wilkerson was CEO of the RXO.

2022–present 
XPO dropped “Logistics” from its name in December 2022 and remains solely as an LTL carrier, which allows multiple customers to transport goods in the same truck. In August 2022, Brad Jacobs announced he was stepping down as CEO and would be replaced by Mario Harik, XPO’s former chief information officer, who also serves as the company’s president.

Operations

North American LTL 
XPO is the second largest provider of less-than-truckload services in North America. Since November 2022, the company’s North American operations have been solely focused on LTL (less-than-truckload) freight transportation. LTL is a freight model which involves shipping smaller quantities of goods for multiple customers at a time. In 2022, XPO's CEO stated that the company operates in 99% of US zip codes. , XPO produces new and remanufactured trailers at a factory in Searcy, Arkansas.

European Transportation Segment 
XPO provides dedicated truckload, LTL, truck brokerage, managed transportation, last mile and freight forwarding in Europe. The company also manages multimodal solutions, such as road-rail and road-short sea combinations. 1,000 new drivers were hired in the U.K. and Ireland in 2022.

Controversy 
A 2018 article by The New York Times profiled experiences of several female employees working at a Memphis warehouse operated by XPO. XPO spokesperson Erin Kurtz stated that the claims were unsubstantiated and filled with inaccuracies.

See also

 Companies listed on the New York Stock Exchange (X)
 Economy of Connecticut

References

External links

2012 initial public offerings
Companies based in Greenwich, Connecticut
Companies listed on the New York Stock Exchange
Greenwich, Connecticut
Logistics companies of the United States
Multinational companies headquartered in the United States
Transport companies established in 1989
Transportation companies based in Connecticut
Trucking companies of the United States